Carlton Tel Aviv is a five-star hotel in Tel Aviv, Israel, specialized in business travel. It is located near Atarim Square, in the immediate vicinity of Tel Aviv Port and the beach. It offers a view of the Mediterranean Sea.

History and architecture
The hotel was built in 1977. In 2001 thorough renovation works were carried out, which cost $15 million. In 2017 it was renovated again for another $12 million.

The hotel is marked by an unusual shape: large floors relative to a narrow base. It is identified with brutalist architecture and was designed by Yaakov Rechter. The concrete building has 15 floors.

The hotel may be rebuilt as part of a redevelopment plan of Atarim Square.

Facilities
The hotel has 268 hotel rooms and suites. There is a conference room with facilities for the support of organized groups. The hotel has two swimming pools, of which one on the roof. There is a synagogue on the second floor.

The hotel has three restaurants:
 Blue Sky
 Lumina
 Carlton on the Beach
The restaurants are led by chef Meir Adoni.

References

Hotels in Tel Aviv
1977 establishments in Israel
Hotels established in 1977
Hotel buildings completed in 1977
Fine dining in Israel
Brutalist architecture in Israel
Yaakov Rechter buildings